Kalininskoye is a rural locality (a village) in Kaltymanovsky Selsoviet, Iglinsky District, Bashkortostan, Russia. The population was 9 as of 2010. There are 3 streets.

Geography 
Kalininskoye is located 27 km southeast of Iglino (the district's administrative centre) by road. Pushkinskoye is the nearest rural locality.

References 

Rural localities in Iglinsky District